Eduardo Celmi Camavinga (born 10 November 2002) is a French professional footballer who plays as a midfielder for La Liga club Real Madrid. Born in Angola, he plays for the France national team.

Early life
Camavinga was born in a refugee camp in Cabinda, Angola in 2002, to Congolese parents from Brazzaville. He has five siblings. His family moved to France when he was two.
They moved to Fougères, where he grew up. He practiced judo for a time, before giving it up to focus solely on football. In 2013, the Camavingas' house was burnt down, destroying most of the family's property; Camavinga stated that this was a source of motivation that pushed him to pursue a career in football and help his family.

On 7 July 2020, he obtained the Baccalauréat ES (Economic and Social) without mention.

Club career

Rennes
Camavinga joined Rennes' youth system when he was 11. He signed his first professional contract on 14 December 2018, at the age of 16 years and one month, becoming the youngest ever professional for the club. He made his professional debut for Rennes in a 3–3 Ligue 1 tie with Angers on 6 April 2019, becoming the youngest player to ever play for Rennes' first team, at 16 years and six months old.

On 18 August 2019, Camavinga recorded an assist and was awarded the man of the match award in a 2–1 win against Paris Saint-Germain. He scored his first goal for Rennes in a 1–0 win against Lyon on 15 December 2019, in the 89th minute of the game.

In the 2020–21 UEFA Champions League, he featured in four matches for Rennes against Krasnodar, Chelsea and Sevilla.

Real Madrid
On 31 August 2021, Real Madrid announced Camavinga had signed a contract until 30 June 2027 From Rennes. He made his debut in a 5–2 win over Celta Vigo on 12 September 2021, in which he scored a goal shortly after coming off the bench. Three days later, on 15 September 2021, he made his Champions League debut for Real Madrid, coming on as a substitute for Luka Modrić in the 80th minute and assisting Rodrygo for the winner against Inter Milan. Camavinga made a substitute appearance in the 85th minute of the 2022 UEFA Champions League Final, helping Real Madrid win 1–0 over Liverpool to earn the 2021–22 UEFA Champions League title with his team.

International career
On 5 November 2019, Camavinga obtained French citizenship. Six days later, he was selected to represent France's under-21 team for games against Georgia and Switzerland, after Matteo Guendouzi was called up to the senior team.

On 27 August 2020, Camavinga was called up to play on France's senior team after Paul Pogba was sidelined by a positive COVID-19 test. He became, in the process, the youngest player to be called up to the French senior team since René Gérard in 1932, who was only 17 years, nine months and 17 days old. On 8 September, he debuted in a 4–2 win against Croatia in the UEFA Nations League, replacing N'Golo Kanté midway through the second half. In doing so he became the youngest player to play for French national team since Maurice Gastiger in 1914 at 17 years, nine months, and 29 days old.

On 7 October 2020, Camavinga made his first start for France in a 7–1 win against Ukraine where he scored his first international goal, opening the scoring with an overhead kick. This made him the youngest goalscorer for France since Maurice Gastiger in 1914.

On 25 June 2021, Camavinga was named in Sylvain Ripoll's 18-man France squad for the Summer Olympics in 2021. However he was later removed from the squad after his club, Rennes, objected.

In November 2022, he was named in the French squad for the 2022 FIFA World Cup in Qatar.

Career statistics

Club

International

Scores and results list France's goal tally first, score column indicates score after each Camavinga goal

Honours
Real Madrid
La Liga: 2021–22
Supercopa de España: 2021–22
UEFA Champions League: 2021–22
UEFA Super Cup: 2022
FIFA Club World Cup: 2022

France
FIFA World Cup runner-up: 2022

Individual
UNFP Ligue 1 Player of the Month: August 2019
IFFHS Men's Youth (U20) World Team: 2020, 2021

References

External links

Profile at the Real Madrid CF website

2002 births
Living people
People from Cabinda Province
French footballers
France international footballers
France youth international footballers
France under-21 international footballers
Angolan footballers
Angolan emigrants to France
Association football midfielders
Stade Rennais F.C. players
Real Madrid CF players
Championnat National 3 players
Ligue 1 players
La Liga players
UEFA Champions League winning players
2022 FIFA World Cup players
French expatriate footballers
Expatriate footballers in Spain
French expatriate sportspeople in Spain
Naturalized citizens of France
Black French sportspeople
French sportspeople of Republic of the Congo descent
Angolan of Republic of the Congo descent